Artur Grottger (11 November 1837 – 13 December 1867) was a Polish Romantic painter and graphic artist, one of the most prominent artists of the mid 19th century under the partitions of Poland, despite a life cut short by incurable illness.

Biography
Grottger was born in Ottyniowice, Eastern Galicia (now Otynevychi, Ukraine) to Jan Józef Grottger, a Polish officer or German origin commanding the Uhlans' Regiment called Warszawskie Dzieci (the Warsaw Children) during the failed November Uprising against the Russians (1831); an amateur artist himself, with many areas of passion. 

At age 11, Artur Grottger was sent from a quiet estate to study painting in Lwów under the apprenticeship of Jan Kanty Maszkowski (1848–1852), (together with Stanisław Tarnowski) and (briefly) Juliusz Kossak. In 1852 he embarked on a journey to Kraków (then in the Austrian Partition) to attend classes at the Jan Matejko Academy of Fine Arts. He studied under Władysław Łuszczkiewicz and Wojciech Kornel Stattler. In 1855–1858 he went to the Academy in Vienna and studied under Karl von Blaas and Christian Ruben. While in Austria, he travelled to Munich, Venice and to Hungary, where he met his biggest future sponsor and benefactor, Count Aleksander Pappenheim. He returned to Poland in 1865 upon the collapse of the January Uprising.

For a time, Grottger moved between the estates of Polish art lovers in Podolia, among others in Manor House of Stanisław Tarnowski in Śniatynka, there he painted numerous paintings for the cycle Lithuania. In 1866 he met his fiancée Wanda Monné, a young Polish patriot; and spent a lot of time at her house. However, he also developed tuberculosis. In 1867 he went to Paris hoping to make more money; visited Hôtel Lambert, and met with Jean-Léon Gérôme. His illness was getting worse and worse. He went to a sanatorium at Amélie-les-Bains-Palalda in the Pyrénées, where he died on 13 December 1867. His body was brought back to Poland by his fiancée and buried at the Lwów Cemetery on 4 July 1868.

Artistic career
Grottger painted mostly epic battle scenes, portraits, and horses. He produced some of his most famous paintings while in Vienna. During his stay in occupied Poland, he poured all of his talent and energy into depicting the hopes and horrors of the failed Polish insurrections in several series of black-and-while panels including Warszawa, Polonia, Lithuania and Wojna (1863–1867) which brought him no income. The series titled "Polonia" included eight boards, depicting the grim realities of everyday life and struggle under Russian occupation. "Polonia" was a response to the failed insurrection of 1863–65. His last painting was his self-portrait.

In 1908, Ignacy Jan Paderewski, whose own father had been caught up in the insurrection and had been arrested, completed his magnum opus, the Symphony in B minor "Polonia", which was inspired by Grottger's series of paintings.

Selected works

See also 
 Academy of Fine Arts in Kraków
 Culture of Kraków
 Phryne

Notes and references 

  at Sopot.pl
 
 

1837 births
1867 deaths
19th-century Polish painters
19th-century Polish male artists
Military art
Polish Austro-Hungarians
Polish people of German descent
People from Lviv Oblast
Burials at Lychakiv Cemetery
Polish male painters